Federal Route 6 is a federal road around Penang Island, Malaysia.

Route background
The Federal Route 6 is the main circular trunk road that circles through the Penang Island. Its starting terminal (Kilometre Zero) and the ending terminal are located at the Penang Port Roundabout, George Town.

History
The road was constructed by the British in the 1920s.

Features
At most sections, the Federal Route 6 was built under the JKR R5 road standard, with a speed limit of 90 km/h.

There are no overlaps, alternate routes, or sections with motorcycle lanes.

List of junctions

References

Malaysian Federal Roads